The China–Japan Tengen was a professional go competition. It was played between Japan's Tengen titleholder and China's Tianyuan titleholder each year in a best-of-three match. The competition was held 15 times, from 1988 to 2002. It was discontinued the following year.

Results

See also
China–Korea Tengen
List of professional Go tournaments

References

External links
China-Japan Tengen Match

International Go competitions